The 1995 Chelmsford Borough Council election took place on 4 May 1995 to elect members of Chelmsford Borough Council in England. This was on the same day as other local elections.

Results summary

Ward results

All Saints

Baddow Road & Great Baddow Village

Boreham

Broomfield Pleshey & Great Waltham

Cathedral

Chignall Good Easter, Highwoodmashbury & Roxwell

East & West Hanningfield

Galleywood

Goat Hall

Great & Little Leighs & Little Waltham

Little Baddow Danbury & Sandon

Margaretting & Stock

Moulsham Lodge

Old Moulsham

Patching Hall

Rettendon & Runwell

Rothmans

South Hanningfield

South Woodham - Chetwood & Collingwood

South Woodham - Elmwood & Woodville

Springfield North

Springfield South

St. Andrews

The Lawns

Waterhouse Farm

Woodham Ferrers & Bicknacre

Writtle

References 

May 1995 events in the United Kingdom
1995 English local elections
1995
1990s in Essex